The siege of Antioch in 968–969 was a successful military offensive undertaken by leading commanders of the Byzantine Empire in order to reconquer the strategically important city of Antioch from the Hamdanid Dynasty.

Following a year of plunder in Syria, the Byzantine Emperor, Nikephoros II Phokas, decided to return to Constantinople for the winter. Before leaving, however, he constructed the Bagras Fort near Antioch and installed Michael Bourtzes as its commander, instructing him and Petros to lay siege to Antioch. Nikephoros explicitly forbade Bourtzes from taking Antioch by force in order to maintain the structural integrity of the city. Bourtzes, however, did not want to wait until winter to take the fortress. He also wanted to impress Nikephoros and earn himself glory, and so he entered into negotiations with the defenders seeking terms for surrender. At this point, Petros was engaged in a raid on the surrounding countryside with the Syrian commander 'Ayšalš, where he probably first entered into communications with Qarquya. Here it is possible that Bourtzes entered into an alliance with Aulax, the commander of the "Kallas" towers. Supposedly, Aulax, in exchange for gifts and prestige, assisted Bourtzes in transporting him, his commander Sachakios Brachamios, and 300 men on top of the Kallas towers during the night; upon ascending the towers, the Byzantines were able to gain a foothold in the outer defenses of the city.

Bourtzes, now in control of the outer walls, sent a message to Petros recalling him to Antioch in order to take the city. At first, Petros was hesitant, remembering the emperor's orders not to take Antioch by force, but, as the requests from Bourtzes became more desperate and his men began to lose ground on the walls, he decided to return to Antioch to assist in taking the city. Petros approached the Kallas gates on 28 October, 969 and, upon witnessing his impending attack, the Antiochenes retreated and were defeated.

Following the capture of Antioch, Bourtzes was removed from his position by Nikephoros due to his disobedience, and would go on to assist in a plot which would end in Nikephoros' assassination, while Petros would move deeper into Syrian territory, besieging and taking Aleppo itself and establishing the Byzantine Tributary of Aleppo through the Treaty of Safar.

References

Sources 
 
 
 

960s conflicts
968
969
Antioch (968-969)
Wars involving the Byzantine Empire
Hamdanid emirate of Aleppo
960s in the Byzantine Empire
Medieval Antioch
Arab–Byzantine wars
10th century in the Byzantine Empire
Antioch 968
Sieges of Antioch